The 1918–19 NC State Wolfpack men's basketball team represents North Carolina State University during the 1918–19 NCAA men's basketball season. The head coach was Tal Stafford coaching the team in his first season. The Wolfpack's team captain was Franklin Cline.

Schedule

References

NC State Wolfpack men's basketball seasons
NC State
NC State Wolf
NC State Wolf